Republic is a far-right political party in Slovakia, led by Milan Uhrík.

It was founded in March 2021 by Uhrík and a group of former members of Marian Kotleba's far-right People's Party Our Slovakia (ĽSNS). Instead of filing a completely new party (which would require the collection of 10,000 supporters' signatures), they took over and renamed the existing "Voice of the People" party led by Peter Marček, which had just 50 members in 2018. Due to defection of former ĽSNS representatives, the party has five seats in the Slovak National Council. Milan Uhrík himself is a member of the European Parliament, elected for ĽSNS in 2019.

See also 
 List of political parties in Slovakia

References

External links 
Official website

Far-right political parties in Slovakia
Political parties established in 2021